Robert Robinson is a retired New Zealand rower.

Robinson competed with the New Zealand men's four at the 1978 World Rowing Championships at Lake Karapiro near Cambridge where the team came seventh. The following year, he won a silver medal with the New Zealand eight at the 1979 World Rowing Championships at Bled in Slovenia, Yugoslavia. He was part of the men's eight again at the 1981 World Rowing Championships in Munich where the team came seventh.

References

Year of birth missing (living people)
Living people
New Zealand male rowers
World Rowing Championships medalists for New Zealand